Rensselaer is a city located along the Iroquois River in Marion Township, Jasper County, Indiana, United States. The population was 5,859 at the 2010 census, up from 5,294 at the 2000 census. The city is the county seat of Jasper County. Saint Joseph's College is located just south of the city limits.

Geography
Rensselaer is located southwest of the center of Jasper County. It is bordered to the south by the unincorporated community of Collegeville, home to Saint Joseph's College. The Iroquois River, a tributary of the Kankakee River and hence part of the Illinois River watershed, flows from east to west through the south part of the city.

U.S. Route 231 and Indiana State Road 114 intersect in the downtown area. US-231 leads north  to DeMotte and south  to Remington, while State Road 114 leads east  to U.S. Route 421 and west  to Interstate 65.

History
This settlement, first platted on June 12, 1839, was originally named "Newton" and was established at the rapids of the Iroquois River. By 1844, it had been renamed "Rensselaer", after James Van Rensselaer, a merchant from Utica, New York, who came to the area after his business failed in the Panic of 1837. He took over the land from Joseph D. Yeoman, who had established a farm some years earlier and had begun to plan the village.

St. Joseph Indian Normal School was established in 1888 by St. Katherine Drexel, an heiress from Philadelphia, who donated $50,000 for the education of Catholic American Indian boys. The school trained 60 boys annually until 1896. The school was operated by the Bureau of Catholic Indian Missions.

In addition to St. Joseph Indian Normal School, the Jasper County Courthouse, Oren F. and Adelia Parker House, Rensselaer Carnegie Library, and Rensselaer Courthouse Square Historic District are listed on the National Register of Historic Places.

Demographics

2010 census
At the 2010 census there were 5,859 people, 2,336 households, and 1,517 families living in the city. The racial makup of the city was 95.4% White, 0.7% African American, 0.4% Native American, 0.4% Asian, 0.1% Pacific Islander, 1.8% from other races, and 1.3% from two or more races. Hispanic or Latino of any race were 5.4%.

Of the 2,336 households 33.4% had children under the age of 18 living with them, 44.9% were married couples living together, 14.7% had a female householder with no husband present, 5.4% had a male householder with no wife present, and 35.1% were non-families. 29.5% of households were one person and 12.6% were one person aged 65 or older. The average household size was 2.42 and the average family size was 2.96.

The median age was 36.6 years. 25.5% of residents were under the age of 18; 8.7% were between the ages of 18 and 24; 25.6% were from 25 to 44; 23.7% were from 45 to 64; and 16.4% were 65 or older. The gender makeup of the city was 48.0% male and 52.0% female.

2000 census
At the 2000 census there were 5,294 people, 2,158 households, and 1,404 families living in the city. The racial makup of the city was 97.94% White, 0.32% African American, 0.21% Native American, 0.09% Asian, 0.66% from other races, and 0.77% from two or more races. Hispanic or Latino of any race were 2.53%.

Of the 2,158 households 31.2% had children under the age of 18 living with them, 50.1% were married couples living together, 10.8% had a female householder with no husband present, and 34.9% were non-families. 31.1% of households were one person and 15.6% were one person aged 65 or older. The average household size was 2.37 and the average family size was 2.98.

The age distribution was 25.3% under the age of 18, 9.4% from 18 to 24, 26.9% from 25 to 44, 20.0% from 45 to 64, and 18.5% 65 or older. The median age was 36 years. For every 100 females, there were 89.0 males. For every 100 females age 18 and over, there were 83.4 males.

The median household income was $34,821 and the median family income  was $43,313. Males had a median income of $33,971 versus $24,016 for females. The per capita income for the city was $20,872. About 6.6% of families and 10.0% of the population were below the poverty line, including 11.8% of those under age 18 and 8.0% of those age 65 or over.

Climate
Humid continental climate is a climatic region typified by large seasonal temperature differences, with warm to hot (and often humid) summers and cold (sometimes severely cold) winters. Precipitation is relatively well distributed year-round in many areas with this climate, while others may see a marked reduction in wintry precipitation and even a wintertime drought.  The Köppen Climate Classification subtype for this climate is "Dfa". (Hot Summer Continental Climate).

Education
Rensselaer has a public library, a branch of the Jasper County Public Library.

Transportation
Rensselaer is served by Amtrak's Cardinal, which runs three days per week, stopping at the Rensselaer Amtrak station.

Notable people
 Eleanor Stackhouse Atkinson, author
 Dan Brandenburg, National Football League player, Buffalo Bills 1996-1999
 Steve Buyer, former U.S. Representative
 Charles A. Halleck, Republican leader of the U.S. House of Representatives
 James Frederick "Jimmy" Hanley, American songwriter
 Tom Harmon, 1940 Heisman Trophy winner
 Eli Isom, professional wrestler
 Michael Stephen Kanne, Judge on the 7th Circuit Court of Appeals 
 Robert H. Milroy, Major General in the Union Army during the American Civil War
 Augustus Phillips, actor during the silent film era

References

External links

 City of Rensselaer official website

Cities in Indiana
Populated places established in 1839
Cities in Jasper County, Indiana
County seats in Indiana
Northwest Indiana
Towns in Indiana
1858 establishments in Indiana